The Independent Games Festival (IGF) is an annual festival at the Game Developers Conference (GDC), the largest annual gathering of the independent video game industry. Originally founded in 1998 to promote independent video game developers, and innovation in video game development by CMP Media, later known as UBM Technology Group, IGF is now owned by Informa after UBM's acquisition.

The IGF competition awards a total of $50,000 in prizes to independent developers in Main Competition and Student Competition categories, and held around the same time as the Game Developers Choice Awards event.

From 2007 to 2010, there was a separate event called IGF Mobile for mobile phone games.

Competition Structure
The festival awards ceremony is split into two broad categories: the main IGF competition and the IGF Student Showcase.

The main Independent Games Festival, held in March 2012 at San Francisco's GDC 2012, distributed nine major awards:

Seumas McNally Grand Prize ($30,000)
Nuovo Award ($5,000) (originally Innovation Award)
Excellence In Visual Art ($3,000)
Excellence In Audio ($3,000)
Excellence in Design ($3,000)
Technical Excellence ($3,000)
Best Mobile Game ($3,000)
Audience Award ($3,000)

An additional award, "Excellent in Narrative", was added for the 2013 IGF.

In addition, the IGF's Student Showcase competition gives out the following awards each year:

IGF Student Showcase Winner (eight winners, $500)
Best Student Game ($3000)

Prior to the Festival, developers have the opportunity to submit their game in a playable state to the IGF organization committee for a small fee. These titles are then sent to approximately 300 game industry representatives on the Nominating Committee; these representatives include both indie developers and more mainstream developers and publishers. Each Committee member can nominate any of the provided games to one or more of the categories. Then, for each award category, a pre-selected jury of between seven and fifteen members reviews the nominations and makes a final selection of six finalists (eight for the Nuovo award) and a number of honorable mentions.

The selected finalists are expected to present their games at the IGF during the Games Developers Conference; the show provides them a booth space and access to the convention, but finalists either must secure their own travel and lodgings, or name a proxy to demonstrate their games. During the convention, a separate jury selected by the IGF organization committee will review each game, and just prior to the awards, vote for one game in each category. The only exception is the Audience Award, which is voted through online forms by anyone interested.

IGF Competition award history
Years given below indicate the year when the award was given, with the games or developers being recognized from the previous year.

(Main) IGF Competition

Seumas McNally Grand Prize ($30,000)

2022: Inscryption
2021: Umurangi Generation
2020: A Short Hike
2019: Return of the Obra Dinn
2018: Night in the Woods
2017: Quadrilateral Cowboy
2016: Her Story
2015: Outer Wilds
2014: Papers, Please
2013: Cart Life
2012: Fez
2011: Minecraft
2010: Monaco
2009: Blueberry Garden
2008: Crayon Physics Deluxe
2007: Aquaria
2006: Darwinia
2005: (Open Category) Gish and (Web/Downloadable) Wik and the Fable of Souls
2004: (Open Category) Savage: The Battle for Newerth and (Web/Downloadable) Oasis
2003: Wild Earth
2002: Bad Milk
2001: Shattered Galaxy
2000: Tread Marks
1999: Fire and Darkness

Nuovo (Innovation) Award ($5,000)
2022: Memory Card
2021: Blaseball
2020: The Space Between
2019: Black Room
2018: Getting Over It with Bennett Foddy
2017: Oiκοςpiel, Book I
2016: Cibele
2015: Tetrageddon Games
2014: Luxuria Superbia
2013: Cart Life
2012: Storyteller
2011: Nidhogg
2010: Tuning
2009: Between

Excellence In Visual Art ($3,000)
2022: Papetura
2021: Genesis Noir
2020: Knights and Bikes
2019: Mirror Drop
2018: Chuchel
2017: Hyper Light Drifter
2016: Oxenfree
2015: Metamorphabet
2014: Gorogoa
2013: Kentucky Route Zero
2012: Dear Esther
2011: BIT.TRIP RUNNER
2010: Limbo
2009: Machinarium
2008: Fez
2007: Castle Crashers
2006: Darwinia
2005: (Open Category) Alien Hominid and (Web/Downloadable) Wik and the Fable of Souls
2004: (Open Category) Spartan and (Web/Downloadable) Dr. Blob's Organism
2003: Wild Earth
2002: Banja Taiyo
2001: Hardwood Spades
2000: King of Dragon Pass
1999: Crime Cities

Excellence In Audio ($3,000)
2022: Inscryption
2021: Genesis Noir
2020: Mutazione
2019: Paratopic
2018: Uurnog Uurnlimited
2017: GoNNER
2016: Mini Metro
2015: Ephemerid: A Musical Adventure
2014: DEVICE 6
2013: 140
2012: Botanicula
2011: Amnesia: The Dark Descent
2010: Closure
2009: BrainPipe
2008: Audiosurf
2007: Everyday Shooter
2006: Weird Worlds: Return to Infinite Space
2005: (Open Category) Steer Madness and (Web/Downloadable) Global Defense Network
2004: (Open Category) Anito: Defend a Land Enraged and (Web/Downloadable) Dr. Blob's Organism
2003: Terraformers
2002: Bad Milk
2001: Chase Ace 2
2000: Blix
1999: Terminus

Excellence in Design ($3,000)
2022: Inscryption
2021: Teardown
2020: Patrick's Parabox
2019: Opus Magnum
2018: Baba is You
2017: Quadrilateral Cowboy
2016: Keep Talking and Nobody Explodes
2015: Outer Wilds
2014: Papers, Please
2013: FTL: Faster Than Light
2012: Spelunky
2011: Desktop Dungeons
2010: Monaco
2009: Musaic Box
2008: World of Goo
2007: Everyday Shooter
2006: Braid
2005: (Open Category) Gish and (Web/Downloadable) Wik and the Fable of Souls
2004: (Open Category) Bontãgo and (Web/Downloadable) Oasis
2003: Wild Earth
2002: Insaniquarium
2001: Shattered Galaxy
2000: Tread Marks
1999: Resurrection

Excellence in Narrative
2022: Inscryption
2021: Umurangi Generation
2020: Heaven's Vault
2019: Return of the Obra Dinn
2018: Night in the Woods
2017: Ladykiller in a Bind
2016: Her Story
2015: 80 Days
2014: Papers, Please
2013: Cart Life

Audience Award ($3,000)
2022: Mini Motorways
2020: A Short Hike
2019: Ethereal
2018: Celeste
2017: Hyper Light Drifter
2016: Undertale
2015: This War of Mine
2014: The Stanley Parable
2013: FTL: Faster Than Light
2012: Frozen Synapse
2011: Minecraft
2010: Heroes of Newerth
2009: Cortex Command
2008: Audiosurf
2007: Castle Crashers
2006: Dofus
2005: (Open Category) Alien Hominid and (Web/Downloadable) N
2004: (Open Category) Savage: The Battle for Newerth and (Web/Downloadable) Yohoho! Puzzle Pirates
2003: Pontifex II
2002: Kung-Fu Chess
2001: Shattered Galaxy
2000: The Rift (Far Gate)
1999: Fire and Darkness

alt.ctrl.GDC Award ($3,000) 
For games that feature unusual controls or user interactions.
2020: None. Due to the cancellation of the physical GDC conference as a result of the coronavirus outbreak, this award wasn't given in 2020; the other IGF awards were given in a virtual presentation.
2019: Hot Swap
2018: Puppet Pandemonium
2017: Fear Sphere

Sponsor Awards
2019 ID@Xbox Gaming Heroes Award: Jerry Lawson
2018 ID@Xbox Award: SpecialEffect 
2016 ID@Xbox Rising Star Award: Girls Make Games — The Hole Story
2012 Microsoft Xbox Live Arcade Award: Super T.I.M.E. Force
2011 Direct2Drive Vision Award: Amnesia: The Dark Descent
2010 Direct2Drive Vision Award: Max and the Magic Marker
2009 Direct2Drive Vision Award: Osmos
2008 Gleemie Awards (1x $5,000, 1x $3,000, 1x $2,000): Desktop Tower Defense, Skyrates, Quadradius
2007 GameTap Awards (1x $10,000, 2 x $5,000): Everyday Shooter, Blast Miner, Roboblitz
2006 Adultswim.com Award ($5,000): Dodge That Anvil
2005 Cartoon Network "Project Goldmaster" Award (making a game for Cartoon Network): Digital Builders
2004 AOL/Cartoon Network "Project Goldmaster" Award (making a game for Cartoon Network): Flashbang Studios

Retired awards

Technical Excellence ($3,000)
This award was retired starting from the 2014 competition onward.

2013: Little Inferno
2012: Antichamber
2011: Amnesia: The Dark Descent
2010: Limbo
2009: Cortex Command
2008: World of Goo
2007: Bang! Howdy
2006: Darwinia
2005: (Open Category) Alien Hominid and (Web/Downloadable) RocketBowl
2004: (Open Category) Savage: The Battle for Newerth and (Web/Downloadable) Yohoho! Puzzle Pirates
2003: Reiner Knizia's Samurai
2002: Ace Of Angels
2001: Shattered Galaxy
2000: Tread Marks
1999: Terminus

Best Mobile Game ($3,000)
2012: Beat Sneak Bandit
2011: Helsing's Fire

Best Web Browser Game (2006-2008)
2008: Iron Dukes ($2,500)
2007: Samorost 2 ($2,500)
2006: Dad 'N Me ($2,500)
 This category replaced the separate prizes for Web/Downloadable games awarded in 2004 & 2005.

IGF Mod Competition (2006–2007)

2007 Mod Awards
Best Mod ($5,000 Overall): Weekday Warrior (Half-Life 2)
Best Singleplayer FPS Mod ($500): Weekday Warrior (Half-Life 2)
Best Multiplayer FPS Mod ($500): Eternal Silence (Half-Life 2)
Best RPG Mod ($500): Darkness over Daggerford (Neverwinter Nights)
Best 'Other' Mod ($500): Spawns Of Deflebub (Unreal Tournament 2004)

2006 Mod Awards
Best Mod – Doom 3 ($2,500): Last Man Standing Coop
Best Mod – Half-Life 2 ($2,500): Dystopia
Best Mod – Neverwinter Nights ($2,500): Rose Of Eternity: Chapter 1
Best Mod – Unreal Tournament 2004 ($2,500): Path Of Vengeance

IGF Student Showcase Winner
2020: Bore Dome
2019: After Hours
2018: Baba Is You
2017: Un pas fragile
2016: Beglitched
2015: Close Your
2014: Risk of Rain
2013: Zineth
2012: Way
2011: Fract Octodad 
2010: Continuity Dreamside Maroon Gear Igneous
2009: Tag: The Power of Paint
2008: Synaesthete
2007: Toblo
2006: Ballistic Cloud Colormental Narbacular Drop Ocular Ink Orblitz Palette Sea of Chaos Goliath NERO
2005: Dyadin Intergalactic Shopping Maniacs Mutton Mayhem Rock Station Scavenger Hunt Soccer Ref Squirrel Squabble Stars and Stripes Team Robot War, Siege & Conquest: Battle for Gaia
2004: Dark Archon 2 Fatal Traction Growbot Hexvex Hyperbol Ice Wars Kube Kombat Scrapped Treefort Wars Xazzon

See also
Indiecade
Independent video game development

References

External links

 Official site
 IGF's complete listing of finalists and winners (most recent year)

Festivals established in 1999
Indie video game festivals
Informa brands